Martin Damm and Anders Järryd were the defending champions but only Järryd competed that year with Jan Apell.

Apell and Järryd lost in the first round to Wayne Arthurs and Jeff Tarango.

Yevgeny Kafelnikov and Andrei Olhovskiy won in the final 6–3, 6–4 against Nicklas Kulti and Peter Nyborg.

Seeds

Draw

External links
 1996 St. Petersburg Open Doubles draw

St. Petersburg Open
St. Petersburg Open
1996 in Russian tennis